Jonathan Meeks (born November 8, 1989) is a former American football safety. He played college football for Clemson University and was drafted by the Buffalo Bills in the fifth round of the 2013 NFL Draft.

High school
Meeks attended Rock Hill High School in Rock Hill, South Carolina, where he played quarterback and free safety as a senior. He had 896 rushing yards and 14 touchdowns, and 612 passing yards and seven touchdowns. Defensively, he recorded 69 tackles and two interceptions. He spent one semester at Hargrave Military Academy in Chatham, Virginia following high school, in order to raise his necessary test scores for NCAA standards.

He was rated a four-star recruit by Rivals.com.

College career
While attending Clemson University in Clemson, South Carolina, Meeks played for the Clemson Tigers football team from 2009 to 2012.

Professional career
He was drafted by the Buffalo Bills in the fifth round, 143rd overall, of the 2013 NFL Draft.

Expected to back up Aaron Williams at SS with Duke Williams, who was also drafted in the 2013 NFL Draft. He was injured while playing against Cincinnati Bengals in Week 4 and was placed on the injured reserve designated to return list. He was released by the Bills on September 5, 2015. On September 6, 2015, the Bills signed Meeks to their practice squad. On September 23, 2015, Meeks was promoted to the active roster from the practice squad.

NFL statistics

References

External links
Buffalo Bills bio 
Clemson Tigers bio

American football safeties
Clemson Tigers football players
Buffalo Bills players
Living people
1989 births
People from Rock Hill, South Carolina
Players of American football from South Carolina
Rock Hill High School (South Carolina) alumni